Giruwari is one of the village located in north part of Nawalparasi district of Lumnini Zone in the western development region of Nepal. Lumbinī (Sanskrit: लुम्बिनी, "the lovely") is a Buddhist pilgrimage site in the Rupandehi district of Nepal.[1] It is the place where Queen Mayadevi gave birth to Siddhartha Gautama, who is the Buddha. Gautama founded the Buddhist tradition. Buddha lived between roughly 563 and 483 BC. Lumbini is one of four magnets for pilgrimage that sprang up in places pivotal to the life of the Buddha, the others being at Kushinagar, Bodh Gaya and Sarnath.

The distance between Deurali's most popular place Jhayalbas and Girwari is 3 KM which goes via Belahani. Neighboring places of Girwari-Jhaylbas are Jhyalbas(झ्यालवास), Julpitar, Koliya(कोलीया), Belahani(वेलाहानी), Beluwa(वेलुवा), Gaindakhola(गैंडाखोला), Dihi(डिही). The nine villages combined together is called Deurali(देउराली) village development committee(VDC). Giruwari is in ward number 3. Deurali is a village development committee in Nawalparasi District in the Lumbini Zone of southern Nepal. At the time of 1991 Nepal census it had a population of 10,537 people living in 1627 individual households but now (2012), it has population more than 30 thousand.

Local people who are living in this village are migrated from Palpa, Syangja Tanahu, Baglung, hilly region of Nawalprasi.  Basically, here people are followers of Hindu and Boudhist religion.

There are  four varnas of the Hindu social order. All varnas of Hindu are living in this village harmonically. Brahmin, Kshetri, Vaishya and Shudra are staying in this village. People nowadays are more educated and there is no racism. People are cooperative, helpful and generous there.

Giruwari (गिरुवारी) is a well-known place for football lovers as well where local club named United youth club (UYC)  organises a football championship every year on the occasion of Teej. (Teej (तीज) is a fasting festival for Hindu women).

Main crops are rice, wheat, buckwheat, mustard, banana, barley, millet, sesame, soya bean and vegetables e.g. cauliflower, cucumber, potato, zucchini etc.

Giruwari has one higher secondary school named Shree Saraswati Sanskrit and General Higher Secondary School. This school is one of the oldest schools of the district. This school has already celebrated its golden jubilee. This school started to pass out students from 2042 (1986). There were 16 students in the first batch of the SLC among them 4 passed out in SLC, they were Madhav Regmi, Durga Rijal, Chitrra Rana and Oman Singh Rajali. All of them are well established in their field. Oman Singh is a well-known social activist in Deurali VDC, Chitra Rana is an officer of British army and is settled in the UK, where as Durga Rijal and Madhav Regmi continued their studies and graduated in agriculture and chemistry respectively. Durga is a well-known officer in civil service in Nepal, and Madhav is an expert in chemistry and education and lives in UK. 
The school has a big football ground and is very famous for best football playground as well as national game competition in honour of His Majesty the late King Birendra Bir Bikram Shah Dev called Birendra shield. There is also Shiva Temple and Maula kalika.

There is a transportation from Chormara to Jhyalbas which is about 13 km long. The road is graveled. Jhyalbas is a popular place in Deurali VDC because of its pleasant weather and base point for its northern mountain villages such as Rumsi, Baseni, Namjakot, Kuwakot etc as well its western villages such as Guheri. Jhyalbas is a main market destination of area. Jhyalbas is also a get way to go tracking in northern side. From Jhyalbas, people can go to Rampur Palpa by walk and it generally takes about a one-day walk. In the same token, there is good road between Jhyalbas and Danda. Danda is the place which is located in Mahendra Highway.

Jhyalbas has the similar environment of Khaseuli Butwal. Air movement after 6 PM to 6 AM is very good and smooth so that people enjoy its environment. People who visit Jhyalbas in summer really feels good because of its environment and can sleep whole night with its unique environment. Another good point about Jhyalbas, there will be no fog, mist, haze even in cold Winter although its neighboring village has fog, mist, haze in winter. Jhyalbas is encircled by two rivers in eastern and western side namely Giruwari khola and Phtthar khola respectively. It has beautiful picnic spots and mountain views. Water supply is done in this VDC from Jhyalbas for both drinking and agriculture supplies.

Deurali's most popular places are Jhyalbas, Giruwari, Beluwa, Belahani, Koliya, Julpitar, as well as Rumsi and Guheri. People of Deorali heartly welcome to visit this place.

Populated places in Nawalpur District